The Peristeri (literally "pigeon") is a small river in northwestern Messenia, in the western Peloponnese in Greece. It empties into the Ionian Sea.

Geography
The main branch of the river has its source in the Kyparissia Mountains, near the village Tripyla. The river continues to the west, and flows into the Gulf of Kyparissia, a bay of the Ionian Sea, in Kalo Nero.

See also
List of rivers in Greece

Landforms of Messenia
Rivers of Greece
Rivers of Peloponnese (region)
Drainage basins of the Ionian Sea